Olpe Junior–Senior High School is a public high school located in Olpe, Kansas, in the Southern Lyon County USD 252 school district, serving students in grades 7–12. Olpe has an enrollment of approximately 160 students and a teaching staff of 15. The principal is Shane Clark. The school mascot is the Eagles and the school colors are green and yellow.

Extracurricular activities
The Eagles compete in the Lyon County League. The KSHSAA classification differs each year, switching between 2A or 1A-Div. I, two of the three lowest classes. Throughout its history, Olpe has won several state championships in various sports. Some graduates have gone on to participate in college athletics.

Athletics
The Eagles compete in the Lyon County League and are classified as either a 2A or 1A-Division I school, two of the lowest classifications in Kansas according to KSHSAA. A majority of the sports are coached by the same coaches. Throughout its history, Olpe High School's athletics have won 13 state championships in various sports.
Olpe Junior–Senior High School offers the following sports:

Fall
 Boys' Cross Country
 Girls' Cross Country
 Fall Cheerleading
 Football
 Volleyball

Winter
 Boys' Basketball
 Girls' Basketball
 Winter Cheerleading

Spring
 Golf (high school only)
 Boys' Track and Field
 Girls' Track and Field

High School girls' basketball
The Olpe Lady Eagles basketball team has been successful, having won three team state championships in 1981, 2010 and 2011. As of 2013, the Lady Eagles have won 8 straight Lyon County League tournament titles, and 24 overall. The head coach for the Lady Eagles, Jesse Nelson, is the record holder for most wins in Kansas high school history, with 762 wins at the end of the 2012–13 season. Nelson broke the record on Monday, February 6, 2012.

Cross country/track & field/volleyball
Olpe's girls' cross country team has won the state title 5 times, occurring in 1999, 2000, 2004, 2005, and 2007. Olpe's girls' track and field team has also won the state title 3 times, occurring in 2004, 2010, and 2011, coached by the same head coach, Tom Camien. The boys' track team won their first track and field title in 2016. Plus, Olpe's Volleyball team has won the state title twice, back-to-back, in 2011 and 2012, both in Class 2A and Class 1A-Div. I. The volleyball team was coached by Marilyn Stueve.

Golf
On Tuesday, May 27, 2014, the Olpe boys' golf team won their first championship, and claimed the school's first boys' state title in school history. State took place at the Fort Hays State Municipal Golf Course, where the team took a score of 318, which means every golfer on the team placed in the top-30.

State championships

See also

 List of high schools in Kansas

References

External links
 

Public high schools in Kansas
Public middle schools in Kansas
Schools in Lyon County, Kansas
Educational institutions established in 1953
1953 establishments in Kansas